Sidi Semiane is a town and commune in Tipaza Province in northern Algeria.

See also 

 Battle of Sidi Semiane

References

Communes of Tipaza Province
Cities in Algeria
Algeria